Rickey Allen Bolden (born September 8, 1961) is a former professional American football player who played offensive lineman for six seasons for the Cleveland Browns.

References

1961 births
American football offensive linemen
Cleveland Browns players
SMU Mustangs football players
Living people
Players of American football from Dallas